Landévennec is a commune in the Finistère department of Brittany in north-western France.

Population

Geography

Map

Sights

Landévennec Abbey

Landévennec Abbey lies in the commune.

Ship graveyard

Shortly before entering the roadstead of Brest, the river Aulne forms a bend around the Île de Térénez then the pointe de Pen Forn near Landévennec, where there is a  depth of water regardless of the tide and with the high surrounding hills blocking the winds and thus keeping the water calm. Here is sited a ship graveyard for civilian but particularly naval vessels. The only difficulty is the Capelan bank, to the south of Logonna-Daoulas, where the depth is less than  - this bank has to be passed to reach the base and thus prevents very deep-draught vessels from reaching it.

A naval station was first set up here around 1840 to house reserve fleet vessels and their crews (totalling nearly 200 sailors), and it was visited by Napoleon III and empress Eugénie during their August 1858 trip into Brittany. During the Second World War the base was used by the German occupiers such as the school ship Armorique (sabotaged in August 1944). Post-war, the ship moved from a base for reserve ships kept in readiness to disarmed naval ships left here for other purposes. Other disarmed French ships have been used as breakwaters before the château de Brest or as training ships off the naval school at Lanvéoc-Poulmic, but those at Landévennec await demolition or use for target practice in naval exercises at sea. Despite requests from Landévennec's mayor, the aircraft carrier Clemenceau was not retired to the base, with the Capelan bank apparently discouraging pilots from attempting to navigate it into the base. However, having been emptied of nearly all its occupants, in August 2006 the graveyard took on three former breakwaters which would become Brest's "port du Château" and had been moved to allow expansion work to begin. The cruiser Colbert and the Soviet-built hydrofoil ferry Kometa from the Penn-ar-Bed company (which provided summer services to Ushant) are now also based here.

See also
Communes of the Finistère department
Landévennec Abbey
Parc naturel régional d'Armorique

References

External links

Official website 

Mayors of Finistère Association 

Communes of Finistère
Ship graveyards